Elton is a town in Jefferson Davis Parish, Louisiana, United States. The population was 992 at the 2020 census, down from 1,128 at the 2010 census. It is part of the Jennings Micropolitan Statistical Area.

History
The wife of pioneer settler J. M. Henderson is said to have chosen the name "Elton" for her home town from a book in which she read of an English town named Elton. That was probably the town on the northwest coast of England in County Durham near Middlesbrough. Elton, Louisiana, was incorporated as a village in 1911.

Geography
Elton is in northeast Jefferson Davis Parish and is bordered to the north by Allen Parish. U.S. Route 190 passes through the town, leading east  to Eunice and west  to Kinder.

Demographics

As of the 2020 United States census, there were 992 people, 504 households, and 291 families residing in the town.

Education
Jefferson Davis Parish Public Schools operates public schools in Elton. Schools serving Elton, within Elton, include Elton Elementary School (PK-5) and Elton High School (6-12).

Jefferson Davis Parish Library operates the Elton Branch at 813 Main Street.

Notable people
Al Woods- American football player for the Seattle Seahawks
Leo Thomas, Zydeco drummer and vocalist
Leroy Thomas, Zydeco vocalist and musician known as "The Jewel of the Bayou." Son of Leo Thomas
Joseph F. Fuselier, first sheriff of Jefferson Davis Parish

References

Towns in Louisiana
Towns in Jefferson Davis Parish, Louisiana